The Cottonwood School No. 45 is a historic school building, now converted to a residence, in rural Boone County, Arkansas.  It is located on Dubuque Road, northeast of the hamlet of Self.  It is a single-story Craftsman style structure, finished in rubblestone veneer on a concrete foundation.  A gabled porch extends across the central portion of the main facade, supported by three tapered posts on stone piers.  The main roof is a gable-on-hip form.  The school was built in 1926, and served the local community as a school and meeting place until 1945.  It was converted to residential use in 1948, and underwent major rehabilitation in the 1980s.

The building was listed on the National Register of Historic Places in 2002.

See also
National Register of Historic Places listings in Boone County, Arkansas

References

School buildings on the National Register of Historic Places in Arkansas
National Register of Historic Places in Boone County, Arkansas
School buildings completed in 1926
1926 establishments in Arkansas
Education in Boone County, Arkansas
Educational institutions disestablished in 1945
Bungalow architecture in Arkansas
American Craftsman architecture in Arkansas